Pithas are a variety of food similar to pancakes, dumplings or fritters, originating from  the Indian subcontinent, common in Bangladesh and India. Pitha can be sweet or savoury, and usually made from a dough or batter, which is then steamed, fried or griddled. Very few varieties are oven-baked or boiled, and most are unleavened and cooked on a stovetop (or equivalent). Some versions may have a filling, garnish, or sauce. Few may be set or shaped after cooking. They are typically eaten as a snack with chai, or as treats during special occasions (similar to mithai).

Pitha is especially popular in Bangladesh and the eastern Indian states of Bihar, Uttar Pradesh (eastern parts), West Bengal, Odisha, Jharkhand, the South Indian state of Kerala, and the Northeast Indian states, especially Assam. Pithas are typically made of rice flour, although there are some types of pitha made of wheat flour. Less common types of pitha are made of palm or ol (a local root vegetable).

Preparation
Pithas are primarily made from a batter of rice flour or wheat flour, which is shaped and optionally filled with sweet or savory ingredients. When filled, the pitha's pouch is called a khol (literally "container") and the fillings are called pur.

For stuffed vegetable pithas, ingredients such as cauliflower, cabbage, radish, or potato are usually fried, baked, or steamed, and then mashed, cooled, and formed into small balls to stuff into the pithas.

Sweet pithas typically contain sugar, jaggery, date juice, or palm syrup, and can be filled with grated coconut, fried or roasted sesame seeds, cashews, pistachios, sweetened vegetables, or fruits. Sweet pithas are also often flavored using cardamom or camphor.

Depending on the type of pitha being prepared, pithas can be fried in oil or ghee, slow-roasted over a fire, steamed, or baked and rolled over a hot plate.

Pithas are often eaten during breakfast, as a snack with (often with tea), and in dinner or lunch. Although there are many sweet varieties that are reserved for desserts or holidays.

Different pithas from each region
Pithas vary considerably across the regions of the eastern Indian subcontinent.

In Odisha

In Odisha, pitha are a group of festive preparations, usually prepared on ritual days as part of an Osa or Brata. Pithas are part of the Mahaprasada and are prepared every day by the Mahasuaras in the Rosasala of the Jagannatha Temple, Puri. They have been prepared in the same method for several millennia in the temple kitchen. Several pithas owe their origin to the state. Some common pithas are:

 Enduri Pitha (ଏଣ୍ଡୁରି ପିଠା) : Prepared on Prathamastami with sweetened jaggery and coconut stuffing using turmeric leaves.
 Poda Pitha (ପୋଡ଼ପିଠା) : Semi-burnt rice-based Pitha with coconut that is sweet to taste, offered to Jagannatha in Ratha Jatra.
 Kakara Pitha (କାକରା ପିଠା) : Prepared during most festivals, it consists of deep-fried Suji stuffed with rich coconut stuffing.
 Arisa Pitha (ଆରିସା ପିଠା) : Rice-based Pitha topped with sesame seeds, ritually prepared in the month of Margasira during Manabasa Gurubara (Lakhmi Puja). Merchants Tapassu and Bhallika from Odisha offered this to the Buddha himself as a token of respect from their land. This leads to the fact that this ancient pitha was prepared in Odisha from at least 2000 years ago.
 Manda Pitha (ମଣ୍ଡା ପିଠା) : Steamed pitha stuffed with coconut and jaggery mix, prepared in most festivals including Manabasa Gurubara, Kumara Purnima, etc.
 Sarsatia Pitha (ସରସତିଆ ପିଠା‌) : Crispy sweet Pitha made using Arua and resin from twigs of the Ganjer tree. Popular in Western Odisha.
 Chakuli Pitha (ଚକୁଳି ପିଠା) : Flat rice pitha resembling pancake, one of the few non-sweet Pithas of Odisha
 Chitau Pitha (ଚିତଉ ପିଠା) : Resembling Chakuli, but with different texture and thickness. Prepared on Chitalagi Amabasya.
 Chandrakanti Pitha (ଚନ୍ଦ୍ରକାନ୍ତି ପିଠା‌‌) : Deep-fried Pitha made of green gram and rice flour. Prepared on Dipabali.
 Gaintha Pitha (ଗଇଁଠା ବା ଗଇଣ୍ଠା ପିଠା) : Rice flour dough balls soaked in thickened cardamom flavoured milk. Prepared on Bakula Amabasya.

In Assam

In Assam, pitha is a special class of rice preparation generally made only on special occasions like Bihu. Assamese pithas are often made from bora saul, a special kind of glutinous rice, or xaali saul, or sun-dried rice. Some pithas commonly found in Assam include the following:
কাঁচি পিঠা Kachi pitha (lit. "Sickle pitha"): a pan baked pancake made from bora saul and filled with sesame seeds, ground coconut, dried orange rind, and jaggery. The sickle is known as " Kachi" in Assamese and hence the name. 
 ঘিলা পিঠা Ghila pitha (lit. "knee pitha"): a fried pitha made from bora saul and jaggery. Salt can also be used instead of jaggery for a savory variant.
 চুঙা পিঠা Sunga pitha: a special pitha made with both xaali saul and bora saul, which are mixed with water and jaggery and churned thoroughly before being placed in a young bamboo tube corked with banana leaf and roasted in fire. The resulting tube-shaped cake is then cut into pieces and served with hot milk.
 টেকেলি পিঠা Tekeli pitha (lit. "earthenware pitha"): a special pitha made with both xaali saul and bora saul, mixed with coconut, sugar, and powdered milk. Ground cardamom and dried orange rind can also be added. The pitha is steamed in an earthenware pot or a kettle set on a hearth.
উহোৱা পিঠা Uhuwa pitha: Rice flour of Xaali Saul and Bora Saul is mixed with jaggery or salt and water and churned thoroughly. The paste is rolled into small balls and flattened and then boiled in water. It is served with tea and also can be eaten with milk.
কেটলি পিঠা Ketli pitha: The method of preparation, as well as the substance, is as same as tekeli pitha, but a kettle is used here instead of the earthenware. That is the reason it is called Ketli pitha (Ketli in Assamese means kettle). Here the kettle-cork is kept upside down on the kettle and the substance is put on it. It usually takes less time to be baked than tekeli pitha takes.
তিল পিঠা Til pitha: This is made with sesame and rice. The rice flour is spread in a circle on a pan, basically made of cast iron and heated. The roasted sesame seeds are placed in the circle along with sugar or jaggery and rolled. These are cylindrical shaped, more like a cigar.
তেল পিঠা Tel pitha this is a pitha which is fried in oil.
নাৰিকল দিয়া পিঠা বা নাৰিকলৰ পিঠা Narikol diya pitha
সুতুলি পিঠা Xutuli pitha
ধূপ পিঠা Dhup pitha, also known as Bhapa pitha
ভাপতদিয়া পিঠা Bhapotdiya pitha
লখিমী পিঠা Lakhimi pitha
তৰা পিঠা Tora pitha 
মুঠিয়া পিঠা Muthiya pitha 
খোলাচাপৰি পিঠা Kholasapori pitha 
লস্কৰা Laskara
আঙুলি পিঠা Anguli Pitha: In Assamese language, ‘anguli’ means finger while ‘pitha’ is a type of rice cake. ‘Anguli Pitha’ has got its name from the fact that the pithas are shaped like fingers.

In Bangladesh, West Bengal, Tripura

While some pitha can be made at any time of the year in Bengal (Bangladesh and Indian states of West Bengal, Tripura, Assam, Mizoram, Nagaland, Meghalaya, Manipur, Orissa, Jharkhand and Bihar), there are special pitha strongly associated with harvest festivals such as Nabanna ( nôbanno, literally "new rice" or "new food") and the Poush parbon or Makar Sankranti, celebrated on January 14 every year. During the autumn and winter seasons, festivals dedicated to pitha called pitha mela or pitha utshob are held locally all over Bangladesh.

Some common ingredients in pitha are rice flour, milk, coconut and jaggery. It is often served with sweet syrups such as date tree molasses ( khejurer guṛ). A few of the most common pitha found in Bengal include the following:
তেলের পিঠা Teler piṭha (lit. "oil pitha"), also known as Guror Handesh or simply as Handesh is a Pitha which originated in Sylhet, Bangladesh.
খোলা চিতই khola chitoi is a crêpe made with rice flour abd and eggs and originate from Noakhali
নুনের পিঠা Nuner pitha (lit. “The pitha of salt.”) is generally a mixture of water, Onions, Gingers, Turmeric powder, Salt, Coriander leaves, Chilli pepper and rice flour, after adding the rice flour the mixture will turn into dough after which it’s smashed down and cut into circles. Nuner Pitha originated from Sylhet.
দুধ চিতই  Dudh Chitoi
সিঈারা Shingara is a Bangladeshi version of a samosa. Some do consider this a Pitha.
ভ
মোহনবাঁশি Mohon bashi
পাকন পিঠা Pakan piṭha is a small piece of special dough with the artistic symbols of generally a leaf or a flour fried and soaked with shira (sauger water with cardamom)
পুলি পিঠা Puli piṭha: a dumpling like dish with brads in the end and stuffed with a coconut mixture or kheer. Fried or Steamed.
বেনি পিঠা Beni piṭha (lit. "braid pitha")
দুধের পিঠা Dudher piṭha (lit. "milk pitha") or ভিজা পিঠা bhija piṭha (lit. "wet pitha")
চন্দ্র পুলি Chôndropuli
চন্দনপাতা Chondonpata
মাছ পিঠা Mach Pitha is fish shape samosa stuffed with fish mince
মুগের পুলি Muger puli
বিস্কুট পিঠা Biscuit pitha is a deep fried cookies. Generally in different shape and colors.
দুধ পুলি Dudh puli
 Nakshi Pitha (lit. “The Pitha of artistic patterns”) is a piece of special dough sculpted into art via a bamboo stick or a small metal plate moulded into a v shape, this Pitha is a beautiful piece of art originating from the rural part of Bangladesh.
পাটিসাপটা পিঠা Paṭi shapta or Patibola পাটিবলা (thin crepes stuffed with jaggery and coconut or kheer)
ভাপা পিঠা/ধুপি পিঠা Bhapa Pitha/Dhupi pitha is a steamed ricecake
তালের পিঠা Taler pitha (lit. “palm pitha”) is a Pitha that can be made in many ways, it can be fried, steamed, made with batter and more but it always has to be made with Asian palmyra palm fruits. Taler Pitha has many varieties and each originating from a different place in Bengal such as the batter version of Taler Pitha and Taler Bibi khan Pitha  which originated from Bangladesh and some other versions which originated from other West Bengal and neighbouring regions such as Tripura, Assam, Mizoram, Nagaland, Meghalaya, Manipur, Orissa, Jharkhand and Bihar.
তালের বিবি খান পিঠা Taler Bibi khan Pitha is a type of Bibi khan Pitha and a type of Taler pitha.
তালের ভাপা পিঠা Taler Vapa Pitha (lit. “steamed palm Pitha”) is a type of Taler Pitha and Bhapa piṭha.
গোলাপ পিঠা Golap Pitha is a rose shaped deep fried crispy pitha 
মুগ পাকন Mug pakon is a Pitha that has artistic symbols moulded on top and bottom of it and it’s soft since it‘s soaked with shira ( sugar water with cardamom mixed with it).
গোকুল পিঠা Gokul Pitha Is a special dough fried and then soaked with a special type of shira.
Chui Pitha or Chutki Pitha (Traditional Old Dhaka Pitha)
চিতই পিঠা/আস্কে পিঠা Aske Pitha/ Chitoi Pitha is a pancake like dish made with batter, to make a Chitoi Pitha you need to have a special Chitoi Pitha pan where the batter is generally dropped for he mould to form. Chitoi Pitha Is generally eaten with kacha morich bhorta and other spicy bhortas.
পাতা পিঠা Pata pitha (lit. “leaf Pitha”) is a type of leaf shaped Nokshi pitha.
শামুক পিঠা Shamuk pitha is a snail shaped Nokshi Pitha
মেরা পিঠা/দইল্যা পিঠা  Mera pitha/doila Pitha are steamed dumpling made with rice flour, ginger and spice such turmeric, Jaggery
লবঙ্গ লতিকা Lonbongo Lotika (lit. “clove lotika”)
বিবি খান পিঠা Bibi khan Pitha is a steamed Pitha That looks like a cake. Bibi khan Pitha originated in the Bikrampur district, Dhaka, Bangladesh
ক্ষীর মুড়ালি Kheer murali
জামাই পিঠা/চিপস পিঠা  Jamai pitha/Chips pitha (lit. “husband Pitha”) is a batter which is moulded into a shape of a flour, sundried and fried.  Taste like papad or chips. Often different in colors.  This Pitha originated in Bangladesh.
ফুলঝুড়ি পিঠা /ফুলকুচি পিঠা Fuljhuri pitha or Fulkuchi pitha is a  rosette like fried dough. Always made with rice flour.
There are thousands of different pithas in every region of Bengal, these are just a few examples.

In Bhojpuri Region
There is a tradition of preparing Pitha on the occasion of Godhan in Bhojpuri region. It is prepared with soaked and then ground rice and pulses.

Gallery

See also

 List of Indian breads
 List of steamed foods

References

External links
Traditional Pitha Recipes from Odisha 
Varieties of Pitha Recipes

 
Assamese cuisine
Bengali cuisine
Odia cuisine
Indian desserts
Indian breads
Bangladeshi cuisine
Bangladeshi desserts